Irina Rutkovskaya (born 14 January 1969) is a Russian former basketball player who competed in the 1996 Summer Olympics and in the 2000 Summer Olympics.

References

1969 births
Living people
Russian women's basketball players
Olympic basketball players of Russia
Basketball players at the 1996 Summer Olympics
Basketball players at the 2000 Summer Olympics
Soviet women's basketball players